Yelena Pavlovna Volkova (born June 13, 1960 in Yekaterinburg, Russia) is a former Soviet competitive volleyball player and Olympic gold medalist.

References

External links 
 

Soviet women's volleyball players
Olympic volleyball players of the Soviet Union
Volleyball players at the 1988 Summer Olympics
Olympic gold medalists for the Soviet Union
1960 births
Sportspeople from Yekaterinburg
Living people
Russian women's volleyball players
Medalists at the 1988 Summer Olympics
Honoured Masters of Sport of the USSR